Maria Asteria Sastrayu Rahajeng, often called Maria Rahajeng (born October 4, 1991) is an Indonesian beauty pageant titleholder who was the representative from West Sulawesi and crowned Miss Indonesia 2014 on February 17, 2014, by her predecessor, Vania Larissa. As the winner of Miss Indonesia 2014, she represented Indonesia at Miss World 2014 in December 2014 in London.

Early life

Maria was born in Blora, Central Java, to Christophorus Harno and Maria Ekawati. She has a twin sister named Elizabeth Crysansia Sastrayu Rahajeng and a younger sister named Agnes Rahajeng. She was raised in California.

Maria began her education at Redlands Kindergarten in California. She attended Smiley Elementary School and Newmarket Junior High School in California. She continued her education at SMP St. Yoseph in Denpasar, Bali; then SMA Negeri 1 in Denpasar Bali.

She attended Pelita Harapan University, Jakarta, majoring in Broadcasting Communication and graduated cum laude with a 3.7 GPA. During college, she was crowned Miss Pelita Harapan University 2009. In 2013 she participated at APEC Voice of the Future in Denpasar, Bali.

Pageantry

Miss Indonesia 2014
Maria participated in Miss Indonesia 2014 representing West Sulawesi. She was crowned Miss Indonesia 2014 or Miss World Indonesia 2014 by the outgoing titleholder Vania Larissa on February 17, 2014. She managed to beat 33 other contestants from different provinces in Indonesia. During the contest, the head judge Liliana Tanoesoedibjo asked what Maria would do if she won, she said:

"I will represent Indonesia with all my heart. We have diversity that needs to be promoted. It's difficult, but it must be done."

Miss World 2014
Maria represented Indonesia at Miss World 2014 where she competed to succeed the current titleholder, Megan Young of Philippines. Maria placed in Top 10 Talent and she won the Beauty With a Purpose with Miss India, Miss Kenya, Miss Brazil and Miss Guyana. She made into the Top 25, but failed to make into the top 10.

Career

After her reign as Miss Indonesia 2014 ended, Maria became a television presenter. With her twin sister, Elizabeth Rahajeng, she was appointed as official correspondents for E! News Asia. They have their own show called "All Access Indonesia", a three-part segment that covers different topics such as fashion, beauty, lifestyle and travel.

Controversies

Before being selected as a representative for Miss Indonesia, Maria was criticized with regards to her connection to West Sulawesi since she was not from there. She was raised in California, United States and Bali, and she had never set foot in West Sulawesi nor had any family or relatives from West Sulawesi.

Originally, Maria intended to represent Bali in Miss Indonesia. However, since a representative from Bali had been chosen, the Miss Indonesia committee suggested that Maria represent West Sulawesi, as a representative from West Sulawesi had yet to be chosen.

With regards to this matter, the governor of West Sulawesi, Anwar Adnan Saleh explained that before the competition, Maria had requested his permission to represent West Sulawesi via telephone. Anwar congratulated Maria for winning Miss Indonesia and hoped that Maria could visit West Sulawesi. Maria agreed to attend some events in West Sulawesi, including the West Sulawesi Cultural Carnival.

References

External links
 Official Miss Indonesia Website

Living people
1991 births
Javanese people
Indonesian Christians
Indonesian beauty pageant winners
Miss World 2014 delegates
Miss Indonesia winners
Indonesian female models
Indonesian twins
People from Blora Regency